Castle Connell is a ruined castle on the banks of the River Shannon in the village of Castleconnell, some  from the city of Limerick in County Limerick.

History
The castle was built on a rock overlooking the River Shannon by the O'Connell's. It was the seat of the chief of Hy-Cuilean, a territory south-east of Abbeyfeale, in the barony of Upper Connello near the borders of Cork and Kerry. The castle then came into the possession of the O'Briens of Thomond. The castle was blown up by General Godert de Ginkel during the War of the Two Kings.

See also
Carrigogunnell, a castle on the west side of Limerick

Notes

References

Attribution

Castles in County Limerick
Ruined castles in Ireland